Events from the year 1954 in Sweden

Incumbents
 Monarch – Gustaf VI Adolf
 Prime Minister – Tage Erlander

Events
June – The Catalina affair
 Dissolution of the Kvinnliga medborgarskolan vid Fogelstad.

Popular culture

Sport
26 February to 7 March – The 1954 World Ice Hockey Championships were held in Stockholm

Literature
Mio, My Son, children's book by Astrid Lindgren

Film
26 December – Gabrielle, directed by Hasse Ekman, released

Births

15 April – Göran Högosta, ice hockey player
28 April – Peter Schantz, medical scientist
19 May – Lena Einhorn, director, writer and physician
23 July – Philip Zandén, actor
8 September – Johan Harmenberg, fencer.
16 December – Eva Gustafsson, middle-distance runner

Deaths
19 February – Axel Pehrsson-Bramstorp, politician (born 1883)
2 June – Lydia Wahlström, historian and women's rights activist (born 1869)
29 June – Thorsten Svensson, football player (born 1901)

References

 
Sweden
Years of the 20th century in Sweden